Gard Miller was a member of the Wisconsin State Assembly.

Biography
Miller was born in 1851. A resident of Ripon, Wisconsin, he was a farmer by trade.

Assembly career
Miller was a Republican member of the Assembly during the 1905 session.

References

People from Ripon, Wisconsin
Farmers from Wisconsin
1851 births
Year of death missing
Republican Party members of the Wisconsin State Assembly